Rosa de las nieves ("Rose of the Snows") is a 1944 Mexican film. It stars Luis Alcoriza.

References

External links
 

1944 films
1940s Spanish-language films
Mexican black-and-white films
Mexican romantic drama films
1944 romantic drama films
1940s Mexican films